Alek Torgersen (born January 13, 1995) is a former American football quarterback. He played college football at Penn.

Professional career

Atlanta Falcons 
Torgersen signed with the Atlanta Falcons as an undrafted free agent on May 1, 2017. He was waived by the Falcons on September 2, 2017.

Washington Redskins
On September 4, 2017, Torgersen was signed to the Washington Redskins' practice squad. He was released on October 3, 2017.

Detroit Lions
On December 27, 2017, Torgersen was signed to the Detroit Lions' practice squad. He signed a reserve/future contract with the Lions on January 1, 2018.

On April 4, 2018, he was waived by the Lions.

Arizona Cardinals
On April 5, 2018, Torgersen was claimed off waivers by the Arizona Cardinals. He was waived on May 7, 2018.

Arizona Hotshots
On August 6, 2018, Torgersen signed with the Arizona Hotshots of the AAF for the 2019 season.

Birmingham Iron 
Torgersen was drafted by the Birmingham Iron on November 27, 2018 in the 2019 AAF QB Draft. He was waived by the Iron on January 15, 2019, before the start of the regular season.

San Diego Fleet 
During the 2019 AAF season, Torgersen was picked up by the San Diego Fleet after starting quarterback Philip Nelson was placed on injured reserve on March 4. The league ceased operations in April 2019.

References

External links
Penn Quakers bio

1995 births
Living people
Sportspeople from Huntington Beach, California
Players of American football from California
American football quarterbacks
Penn Quakers football players
Atlanta Falcons players
Washington Redskins players
Detroit Lions players
Arizona Cardinals players
Arizona Hotshots players
Birmingham Iron players
San Diego Fleet players